The Marghab River (Persian/Pashto: مرغاب, Morqâb), anciently the Margiana (Ancient Greek: Μαργιανή, Margianḗ), is an  long river in Central Asia. It rises in the Paropamisus Mountains (Selseleh-ye Safīd Kūh) in Ghor Province, flows through the Marghab District in central Afghanistan, then runs northwest towards the Bala Murghab. Reaching the oasis of Mary in the Karakum Desert of Turkmenistan, the Marghab debouches into the Karakum Canal, a diversion of water from the Amu Darya.

Geography

The Marghab River originates in the Ghor Province of central Afghanistan, on a plateau among the chain of mountains of Paropamisus, Gharjistan and Band-i Turkestan.

Between Darband-i Kilrekht and Mukhammedkhan, the Marghab crosses the western part of Band-i Turkestan, and then runs toward the northwest in a deep canyon. At Mukhammedkhan, it crosses the gorges of Jaokar. The Marghab receives the waters of the Kaysar river on the right, then forms the border between Turkmenistan and Afghanistan over a  length.

In the territory of Turkmenistan, close to Tagtabazar, the Marghab receives the Kashan River from the left bank, and  further, there is the confluence of the Kushk. Reaching the oasis of Mary, the Marghab mingles its waters with those of the Karakum Canal, a diversion of water from the Amu Darya.

Hydrometry: the flows at Tagtabazar 
The flow of Marghab was observed during 50 years (1936–85) at Tagtabazar, a location in Turkmenistan about  after the Marghab leaves the Afghan territory, and a score of kilometers upstream of the confluence with the Kushk. The geographically-averaged hydrometric flow passing through this part of the basin, by far greatest from the point of view of the flow, thus reached the figure of 44.3 millimeters per annual, which is very appreciable in this particularly desiccated area.
 
 Monthly mean flows of Murghab (in cubic meters per second) measured at the hydrometric station of Tagtabazar   Data calculated over 50 years  

A 2021 study indicates that in the near term (by 2040), the Marghab's flow could fall by as much as one-third due to climate change, and by 40 percent by the end of the 21st century.

References

External links

 Murgap river (Murghab river) marked on the OpenStreetMap
 Morghab River, in Encyclopædia Britannica
 Map of the province of Ghor, with trace of the flow of water
 Map of vegetation cover in the province of  Badghis, with trace of the flow of water
    

 
Rivers of Afghanistan
Rivers of Turkmenistan
International rivers of Asia